A by-election was held for the New South Wales Legislative Assembly electorate of Wollondilly on 3 March 1928 because of the resignation of Sir George Fuller who had accepted the position of Agent-General in London.

Dates

Result

Sir George Fuller resigned to be appointed Agent-General in London.

See also
Electoral results for the district of Wollondilly
List of New South Wales state by-elections

References

1928 elections in Australia
New South Wales state by-elections
1920s in New South Wales